The Larnerd Case House, also known as Rose Hill, is a historic building located in Des Moines, Iowa, United States.  This two-story, frame, Greek Revival structure is the oldest dwelling that is still standing in the city.  The second floor dormer and the front porch are not original to the house.  This section of Iowa was opened for settlement in 1845 after a treaty with the Sauk and Meskwaki (Fox) tribes.  Larnerd Case, an Ohio native, built this house using black walnut cut from the property in 1846.  He lived on what was then a  farm until his death in 1857.  The residential area that surrounds the house and the park across the street were once part of the farm.  The house was listed on the National Register of Historic Places in 1982.

See also
List of the oldest buildings in Iowa

References

Houses completed in 1846
Greek Revival architecture in Iowa
Houses in Des Moines, Iowa
National Register of Historic Places in Des Moines, Iowa
Houses on the National Register of Historic Places in Iowa